Lepidopteris ("scaly fern") is a form genus for leaves of Late Permian to Late Triassic Period Pteridospermatophyta, or seed ferns, which lived from around 260 to 200 million years ago in what is now Australia, Antarctica, India, South America, South Africa, Russia and China. Nine species are currently recognized.
Lepidopteris was a common and widespread seed fern, which survived the Permian-Triassic extinction event but succumbed to the Triassic-Jurassic extinction event. Lepidopteris callipteroides is especially common between the first two episodes of Permian-Triassic extinction event, and L. ottonis forms a comparable acme zone immediate before the Triassic-Jurassic extinction event. Lepidopteris would persist into the Early Jurassic in Patagonia, represented by the species Lepidopteris scassoi.

Description 

In the form generic system of paleobotany Lepidopteris is used only for leaves, which are fern-like with pinnules attached to the rachis as well as the pinnae. The cuticle of the leaves is thick and has a distinctive cuticular structure with stomatal opening overhung by papillae. This structure has been used to link the fossil leaves with well preserved reproductive structures in the same deposits. The ovules are commonly arranged in peltate structures, which have been used to assign Lepidopteris to the Order Peltaspermales. Not all leaf species are associated with reproductive material, but well established associations include the following.

 Lepidopteris ottonis (leaves), Peltaspermum rotula (ovulate structures) and Antevsia zeilleri (pollen organ). 
 Lepidopteris stormbergensis (leaves), Peltaspermum thomasii  (ovulate structures) and Antevsia extans (pollen organ). 
 Lepidopteris callipteroides (leaves), Peltaspermum townrovii  (ovulate structures) and Permotheca helbyi (pollen organ).

Distribution and species 

Lepidopteris was geographically widespread and ranged from Late Permian to Late Triassic but individual species had more restricted geographic extent and shorter stratigraphic ranges, as seen in the list below in stratigraphic order

 Lepidopteris martinsii from Late Permian of Germany, England and Italy.
 Lepidopteris callipteroides from Late Permian of Madagascar and Australia.
 Lepidopteris madagascariensis from Early Triassic of Madagascar and Australia.
 Lepidopteris stormbergensis from Middle-Late Triassic of South Africa, India, South America and Australia.
 Lepidopteris remota from Middle Triassic of Russia.
 Lepidopteris haizeri from Middle to Late Triassic of Russia
 Lepidopteris heterolateralis from Middle to Late Triassic of Russia.
 Lepidopteris microcellularis from Middle to Late Triassic of Russia.
 Lepidopteris ottonis from Late Triassic of Greenland, Germany, Poland, China and Vietnam.

Atmospheric carbon dioxide paleobarometer 

The cuticular structure of Lepidopteris is comparable to that of modern Ginkgo, which has been used to estimate past atmospheric carbon dioxide from its stomatal index. Because Lepidopteris and Ginkgo leaves in the same South African fossil quarries have the same stomatal index, the calibration for modern Ginkgo has been used to calculate carbon dioxide levels from Late Permian and Triassic Lepidopteris leaves.

References

External links 

Permian plants
Triassic plants
Prehistoric plant genera
Pteridospermatophyta
Guadalupian first appearances
Late Triassic extinctions